The title Earl of Bolingbroke has been created twice, once in the Peerage of England and once in the Jacobite Peerage.

The creation in the Peerage of England occurred on 28 December 1624, when Oliver St John, 4th Baron St John of Bletso, was created Earl of Bolingbroke. His eldest son and heir apparent, Oliver St John, was in 1641 summoned to the House of Lords through a writ of acceleration in his father's junior title of Baron St John of Bletsoe. However, he predeceased his father (killed at the Battle of Edgehill in 1642); nevertheless, the writ of acceleration means that he is formally known as the fifth Baron St John of Bletsoe. The Earl was succeeded by his grandson, Oliver St John, 2nd Earl of Bolingbroke, who was the son of Sir Paulet St John, younger son of the first Earl. The 2nd Earl died childless in 1688 and was succeeded by his younger brother, Paulet St John, 3rd Earl of Bolingbroke, who represented Bedford in the House of Commons. He never married, and on his death, on 5 October 1711, the earldom became extinct.

The creation in the Jacobite Peerage occurred on 26 July 1715 when Henry St John, 1st Viscount Bolingbroke, was created Earl of Bolingbroke by the Old Pretender, this title not being recognised by the British Government, although Bolingbroke returned from exile, was pardoned, and briefly returned to royal favour. He died on 12 December 1751, aged 73, his second wife having predeceased him by one year, and the Jacobite earldom became extinct. Bolingbroke and his wife were both buried in St Mary's Church, Battersea, where a monument with medallions and inscriptions composed by Bolingbroke was erected to their memory. Bolingbroke's great-nephew Frederick St John, succeeded him in the viscountcy.

References

External links
 

Extinct earldoms in the Peerage of England
Extinct earldoms in the Jacobite Peerage
Noble titles created in 1624
Noble titles created in 1715